Adromischus maculatus, the spotted adromischus or calico hearts, is a species of flowering plant in the family Crassulaceae, which is endemic to the Eastern Cape and Western Cape of South Africa.

Plants are variable in colouring. Some are plain green, while others have leaves which are covered in maroon or brown blotches - hence the specific epithet maculatus, meaning "spotted".

Adromischus maculatus grows on the sunny, sandstone slopes of South Africa's Langeberg Mountains. It is widely cultivated, but does not tolerate prolonged frost, so in temperate regions is usually grown indoors as a houseplant. It has gained the Royal Horticultural Society's Award of Garden Merit.

References

Flora of the Cape Provinces
maculatus